Meshir 27 - Coptic Calendar - Meshir 29

The twenty-eighth day of the Coptic month of Meshir, the sixth month of the Coptic year. In common years, this day corresponds to February 22, of the Julian Calendar, and March 7, of the Gregorian Calendar. This day falls in the Coptic Season of Shemu, the season of the Harvest.

Commemorations 

 The relocation of the Relics of the Martyr, Saint Theodore the Oriental (The Roman)

References 

Days of the Coptic calendar